Lance Melvin Larson (born July 3, 1940) is an American former competition swimmer, Olympic champion, and former world record-holder in four events.

Early years
Larson was born in Monterey Park, California, and attended El Monte High School.  He set CIFSS records in 1957 and 1958 in the 100-yards butterfly of 55.5 and 54.6 seconds, and another CIFSS record in 1958 in the 100-yard freestyle of 50.9 seconds.  He was the first high school swimmer to break the 50-second barrier in the 100-yard freestyle.  Larson was the first man in the world to swim the 100-meter butterfly in under sixty seconds.  He enrolled in the University of Southern California, where he swam for the USC Trojans swimming and diving team in National Collegiate Athletic Association (NCAA) competition.  He was an "all-around" swimmer in the four-stroke individual medley, the butterfly, and the sprint freestyle, and he won Amateur Athletic Union (AAU) national championships in all three.

Olympics
He competed at the 1960 Summer Olympics in Rome, Italy, where he received a gold medal for swimming the butterfly leg of the men's 4×100-meter medley relay for the winning U.S. team. The U.S. relay team of Frank McKinney (backstroke), Paul Hait (breaststroke), Larson (butterfly), and Jeff Farrell (freestyle) set a new world record of 4:05.4 in the event final.

Individually, Larson also won a silver medal in the men's 100-meter freestyle at the 1960 Olympics, and he was a participant in one of the most controversial Olympic swimming finishes ever.  John Devitt of Australia was listed as the winner of the men's 100-meter freestyle race.  Results were decided by finish judges who relied on their eyes and did not use replays.  Three judges were assigned to each finishing position.  There were three official timers in 1960 for each lane and swimmer, all timing by hand.  All three timers for Devitt, in lane three, timed him in 55.2 seconds.  The three timers for lane four timed Lance Larson in 55.0, 55.1, and 55.1 seconds.

Former Olympic swimmer and FINA co-founder Max Ritter inspected the judge's scorecards.  Two of the three first-place judges found that Devitt had finished first and the third found for Larson.  Of the three-second-place judges, two found that Devitt finished second and one found that Larson was second.  Ritter pointed out to chief judge Henry Runströmer of Sweden that the scorecards indicated a tie.  Runstrümer cast the deciding vote and declared Devitt the winner.  However, the rules at that time did not provide for the chief judge to have a vote or give him the right to break ties. Ties were supposed to be broken by referring to the timing machine.  The official results placed Devitt first and Larson second, both with the identical time of 55.2 seconds. The United States team appealed, bolstered by videotaped footage of the finish that appeared to show Larson the winner. The appeal jury, headed by Jan de Vries, also the President of FINA in 1960, rejected the appeal, keeping Devitt the winner. This controversy would pave the way for electronic touchpads to be included in swimming events to determine finish and accurate timing.

Larson broke the 100-meter butterfly world record twice in 1960: first, setting the new record of 59.0 seconds on June 29, 1960; and again, a new record of 58.7 seconds on July 24, 1960.

Life after swimming
Larson was formerly married to Betty Lee Puttler (1940–2007) of Newport Beach, California; they had four sons, Lance Jr., Greg, Gary & Randy.  He was remarried in the late 1990s, and has two adopted daughters.  He lives in Southern California's mountain community and retired in 2014 after owning and operating a dentistry practice in Orange, California since 1979.

He was inducted into the International Swimming Hall of Fame as an "Honor Swimmer" in 1980.

See also

 List of Olympic medalists in swimming (men)
 List of University of Southern California people
 World record progression 100 metres butterfly
 World record progression 200 metres individual medley
 World record progression 4 × 100 metres freestyle relay
 World record progression 4 × 100 metres medley relay

References

Bibliography
 Maraniss, David, Rome 1960: The Olympics That Changed the World, Simon & Schuster, New York City (2008).  .

External links
 
 

1940 births
Living people
American male butterfly swimmers
American male freestyle swimmers
American male medley swimmers
World record setters in swimming
Olympic gold medalists for the United States in swimming
Olympic silver medalists for the United States in swimming
Swimmers at the 1960 Summer Olympics
USC Trojans men's swimmers
Medalists at the 1960 Summer Olympics
 American dentists
20th-century American people
21st-century American people